The World Growth Institute is an international non-government organization that is a think tank for economic growth issues.  Staff and contributing fellows comprise former trade diplomats and other government officials to discuss economic growth issues.  Key U.S. economists contributing to World Growth studies include Professor Alan Blinder and Dr. Robert Shapiro, former Undersecretary of Commerce to President Bill Clinton.

External links 
 World Growth Website
 World Growth CEO Ambassador Alan Oxley's biography, APEC meeting

American political websites